Although there has been a large degree of integration between European Union member states, foreign relations is still a largely intergovernmental matter, with the 27 members controlling their own relations to a large degree. However, with the Union holding more weight as a single bloc, there are at times attempts to speak with one voice, notably on trade and energy matters. The High Representative of the Union for Foreign Affairs and Security Policy personifies this role.

Policy and actors

The EU's foreign relations are dealt with either through the Common Foreign and Security Policy decided by the European Council, or the economic trade negotiations handled by the European Commission. The leading EU diplomat in both areas is the High Representative Josep Borrell.   The council can issue negotiating directives (not to be confused with directives, which are legal acts) to the Commission giving parameters for trade negotiations.

A limited amount of defence co-operation takes place within the Common Security and Defence Policy, as well as in programmes coordinated by the European Defence Agency and the Commission through the Directorate-General for Defence Industry and Space . A particular element of this in the Union's foreign relations is the use of the European Peace Facility, which can finance the common costs CSDP missions in third states or assistance measures for third states.

Diplomatic representation

History

The High Authority of the European Coal and Steel Community (ECSC), the EU's predecessor, opened its first mission in London in 1955, three years after non-EU countries began to accredit their missions in Brussels to the Community. The US had been a fervent supporter of the ECSC's efforts from the beginning, and Secretary of State Dean Acheson sent Jean Monnet a dispatch in the name of President Truman confirming full US diplomatic recognition of the ECSC. A US ambassador to the ECSC was accredited soon thereafter, and he headed the second overseas mission to establish diplomatic relations with the Community institutions.

The number of delegates began to rise in the 1960s following the merging of the executive institutions of the three European Communities into a single Commission. Until recently some states had reservations accepting that EU delegations held the full status of a diplomatic mission. Article 20 of the Maastricht Treaty requires the Delegations and the Member States' diplomatic missions to "co-operate in ensuring that the common positions and joint actions adopted by the Council are complied with and implemented".

As part of the process of establishment of the European External Action Service envisioned in the Lisbon Treaty, on 1 January 2010 all former European Commission delegations were renamed European Union delegations and by the end of the month 54 of the missions were transformed into embassy-type missions that employ greater powers than the regular delegations. These upgraded delegations have taken on the role previously carried out by the national embassies of the member state holding the rotating Presidency of the Council of the European Union and merged with the independent Council delegations around the world. Through this the EU delegations take on the role of co-ordinating national embassies and speaking for the EU as a whole, not just the commission.

The first delegation to be upgraded was the one in Washington D.C., the new joint ambassador was João Vale de Almeida who outlined his new powers as speaking for both the Commission and Council presidents, and member states. He would be in charge where there was a common position but otherwise, on bilateral matters, he would not take over from national ambassadors.

Locations

The EU sends its delegates generally only to the capitals of states outside the European Union and cities hosting multilateral bodies. The EU missions work separately from the work of the missions of its member states, however in some circumstances it may share resources and facilities. In Abuja it shares its premises with a number of member states. Additionally to the third-state delegations and offices the European Commission maintains representation in each of the member states.

Prior to the establishment of the European External Action Service by the Treaty of Lisbon there were separate delegations of the Council of the European Union to the United Nations in New York, to the African Union and to Afghanistan - in addition to the European Commission delegations there. In the course of 2010 these would be transformed into integrated European Union delegations.

Member state missions

The EU member states have their own diplomatic missions, in addition to the common EU delegations. On the other hand, additionally to the third-state delegations and offices the European Commission maintains representation in each of the member states. Where the EU delegations have not taken on their full Lisbon Treaty responsibilities, the national embassy of the country holding the rotating EU presidency has the role of representing the CFSP while the EU (formerly the commission) delegation speaks only for the commission.

Member state missions have certain responsibilities to national of fellow states. Consulates are obliged to support EU citizens of other states abroad if they do not have a consulate of their own state in the country. Also, if another EU state makes a request to help their citizens in an emergency then they are obliged to assist. An example would be evacuations where EU states help assist each other's citizens.

No EU member state has embassy in the countries of Antigua and Barbuda, Bahamas, Barbados (EU delegation), Belize (EU office), Bhutan (Denmark Liaison office), Dominica, Gambia (EU office), Grenada, Guyana (EU delegation), Kiribati, Liberia (EU delegation), Liechtenstein, Maldives, Marshall Islands, Micronesia, Nauru, Palau, Saint Kitts and Nevis, Saint Vincent and the Grenadines, Samoa (EU office), Somalia, Solomon Islands, Swaziland (EU office), Tonga, Tuvalu, the sovereign entity Sovereign Military Order of Malta and the partially recognised countries Sahrawi Arab Democratic Republic and Republic of China (Taiwan) (17 non-diplomatic offices). The European Commission also has no delegations or offices to most of them (exceptions mentioned in brackets).

The following countries host only a single Embassy of EU member state: Central African Republic (France, EU delegation), Comoros (France), Lesotho (Ireland, EU delegation), San Marino (Italy), São Tomé and Príncipe (Portugal), Timor-Leste (Portugal, EU delegation), Vanuatu (France, EU delegation). The European Commission also has no delegations or offices to most of them (exceptions mentioned in brackets).

Relations

Africa and the Middle East

The Americas

Asia-Pacific

Europe and Central Asia
The European Union regularly holds High-level Political and Security Dialogues (HLDs) with the countries of Central Asia which include Kazakhstan, the Kyrgyz Republic, Tajikistan, Turkmenistan and Uzbekistan, with Afghanistan often invited as a guest. The HLDs with these states have a focus on security, and provide a formal platform to exchange views and ideas, advance collaboration and support EU involvement in the Central Asian region.

An update to the 10-year-old EU-Central Asia strategy is expected to be developed by the end of 2019. The new EU Central Asia Strategy was introduced at the EU-Central Asia Ministerial meeting in Bishkek, Kyrgyz Republic, on 7 July 2019. Federica Mogherini also presented a set of EU funded regional programmes totaling €72 million. The new programmes cover the following sectors: sustainable energy, economic empowerment, education, and inclusive sustainable growth.

During the COVID-19 pandemic, the EU allocated more than €134 million to Central Asia as part of its “Team Europe” solidarity package. The funds were granted to strengthen the health, water and sanitation systems and address the socio-economic repercussions of the crisis.

The first-ever “EU-Central Asia Economic Forum” is set to take place in 2021. The Forum will focus on innovative and sustainable approach to economic and business development, as well as green economy.

The first Central Asia-EU high-level meeting took place in Astana on 27 October 2022. The participants (representatives from Kazakhstan, Kyrgyzstan, Tajikistan, Uzbekistan, Turkmenistan, and the EU) issued a joint communique, embracing the steps towards the institutionalisation of the relationship between the Central Asian nations and the EU.

EU Programmes in Central Asia

Border Management Programme in Central Asia
The EU launched in 2002 the BOMCA to mitigate the impacts of human trafficking, trafficking of drugs, organised crime and terrorism on EU interests and regional partners.

Central Asia Drug Action Programme
The CADAP works to bolster drug policies of Central Asian states by providing assistance policy makers, industry experts, law enforcement, educators and medical staff, victims of drug abuse, the media and the general public.

Partly recognised states

ACP countries

The European Union's member-states retain close links with many of their former colonies and since the Treaty of Rome there has been a relationship between the Union and the African, Caribbean and Pacific (ACP) countries in the form of ACP-EU Development Cooperation including a joint parliamentary assembly.

The EU is also a leading provider of humanitarian aid, with over 20% of aid received in the ACP coming from the EU budget or from the European Development Fund (EDF).

In April 2007 the Commission offered ACP countries greater access to the EU market; tariff-free rice exports with duty- and quota-free sugar exports. However this offer is being fought by France who, along with other countries, wish to dilute the offer.

There are questions as to whether the special relationship between the ACP group and the European Union will be maintained after the coming to the end of the Cotonou Partnership Agreement Treaty in 2020.  The ACP has begun looking into the future of the group and its relationship to the European Union.  Independent think tanks such as the European Centre for Development Policy Management (ECDPM) have also presented various scenarios for the future of the ACP group in itself and in relation to the European Union.

The European Union's European Neighbourhood Policy (ENP) aims at bringing Europe and its neighbours closer.

International organizations

The Union as a whole is increasingly representing its members in international organisations. Aside from EU-centric organisations (mentioned above) the EU, or the Community, is represented in a number of organisations: 
 full rights member: the G8;, the World Trade Organization; 
 partner: the International Development Association; Pacific Islands Forum; the Pacific Community (SPC) 
 dialogue member: the ASEAN Regional Forum, the South Asian Association for Regional Cooperation
 observer: the United Nations, the Organization of American States, the Council of the Baltic Sea States; the Australia Group; the European Organization for Nuclear Research; the Food and Agriculture Organization, the European Bank for Reconstruction and Development, the G10, the Non-Aligned Movement; Nuclear Suppliers Group; the Organisation for Economic Co-operation and Development; the United Nations Relief and Works Agency for Palestine Refugees in the Near East; and the Zangger Committee

The EU is also one of part of the Quartet on the Middle East, represented by the High Representative. At the UN, some officials see the EU moving towards a single seat on the UN Security Council.

The European Union is expected to accede to the European Convention on Human Rights (the convention). In 2005, the leaders of the Council of Europe reiterated their desire for the EU to accede without delay to ensure consistent human rights protection across Europe. There are also concerns about consistency in case law - the European Court of Justice (the EU's supreme court) is already treating the convention as though it was part of the EU's legal system to prevent conflict between its judgements and those of the European Court of Human Rights (the court interpreting the convention). Protocol No.14 of the convention is designed to allow the EU to accede to it and the Treaty of Lisbon contains a protocol binding the EU to joining. The EU would not be subordinate to the council, but would be subject to its human rights law and external monitoring as its member states are currently. It is further proposed that the EU join as a member of the Council once it has attained its legal personality in the Treaty of Lisbon.

Where the EU itself isn't represented, or when it is only an observer, the EU treaties places certain duties on member states;

Foreign relations of member states

Further reading
 The Role of the EU in the South Caucasus. Articles in the Caucasus Analytical Digest No. 35-36

See also

 Eurosphere
 Future enlargement of the European Union
 List of countries by leading trade partners

Footnotes

External links
Official
 European External Action Service
 Common Foreign and Security Policy (CFSP)
 European Union @ United Nations
Presidency Report on the EEAS (23 October 2009)
European Union Institute for Security Studies
 EU Neighbourhood Info Centre
 EU Neighbourhood Library

Other
 European Parliament Resolution on progress in implementing the common foreign and security policy
 Institute of European and Russian Studies Carleton University
 Euforic information on Europe's international development cooperation
 Europe diary: Europe and the world, Mark Mardell BBC News 29 March 2007
 Online Resource Guide to EU Foreign Policy
 'The Courier' : The magazine of Africa-Caribbean-Pacific and European Union cooperation and relations
 Eurosetp - NGOs network focusing on European development co-operation
 The Independent European Development Portal